Sandy Lake is a lake in Kenora District, Ontario. The Severn River flows through the lake. Sandy Lake First Nation community is located near the lake.

See also
List of lakes in Ontario

References

Lakes of Kenora District